Chemin Vert is a station of the Paris Métro on Line 8, named after the Rue de Chemin Vert.

It is located in between Bastille station and Saint Sébastien - Froissart.

The station opened on 5 May 1931 with the extension of the line from Richelieu - Drouot to Porte de Charenton. The Rue de Chemin Vert (green path) follows the route of an old footpath through the middle of market gardens. In 1868 the Rue de Chemin Vert was extended from the Rue des Amandiers-Popincourt to the Barrier des Amandiers, a gate on the former Wall of the Farmers-General.

In 2011,  passengers entered this station.

Nearby are the Canal Saint-Martin and the Place des Vosges.

Station layout

References

Sources 
 Roland, Gérard (2003). Stations de métro. D’Abbesses à Wagram. Éditions Bonneton.

Paris Métro stations in the 3rd arrondissement of Paris
Paris Métro stations in the 11th arrondissement of Paris
Railway stations in France opened in 1931